REMA 1000 (Bokmål: Rema tusen) is a multinational no-frills soft-discount grocery chain owned entirely by the Reitan Group (Reitangruppen).

With their headquarters located in Oslo, Norway, REMA 1000 includes businesses in Norway and Denmark. The chain is based on a franchised discount concept: buying large quantities of a limited range of products and offering these to semi-independent owners under their brand. By the end of 2016, Rema 1000 had a total amount of 868 shops spread across Norway and Denmark.

By 2016, the retailer captured 24,2% of the total revenue by all Norwegian grocers, taking the lead over its closest rival Kiwi.

The shops 
REMA 1000 shops are known for not spending large sums on aesthetics. As a matter of fact one of the chain's slogans is "The simple is often the best" and this reflects on the layout concept in the shops. Products are often positioned by crate or even by pallet to save the cost of positioning them in a more attractive way, a strategy not unique to REMA. It is still REMA 1000's official policy of not letting cost-saving damage the basic idea of simplicity (in accordance with the slogan). Wide corridors and informative signs are therefore present to simplify the shopping.

History
Odd Reitan, the founder of the company, opened the first REMA shop in Trondheim, Norway, 15 February 1979. Originally some shops were named 'REMA 600', indicating its number of food variety (later to be expanded). The owners had recently visited Germany where they had been impressed by the Albrecht brothers (Theo and Karl) hard-discount chain ALDI's success. They wanted to adapt the ALDI concept to Norwegian conditions.

Originally REMA attempted success with a selection of only 500-600 different products, but soon realised that this selection was too narrow. The success of the third REMA shop (opened in Mo i Rana, 8 May 1980) with a selection of 1,000 different products, paved way for the REMA 1000 brand. Since then, REMA 1000 have expanded their selection to more than 2,500 different products, but the name does not reflect this development.

In 2004, the chain celebrated its 25-year anniversary.

In April 2010, REMA 1000 decided to stop selling eggs from cage hens by the year 2012, to coincide with the scheduled EU-wide prohibition on battery cages.

Countries with REMA 1000 shops

References

External links
Rema 1000 Norway
Rema 1000 Denmark
The official Reitan Group (Reitangruppen) website (the owner of REMA 1000)

Norwegian brands
Supermarkets of Norway
Retail companies established in 1979
No frills